Al-Istibsar (Al-Istibsar fi-ma ikhtalafa min al-Akhbar lit. Reflection Upon the Disputed Traditions or The Perspicacious or The Book of Insight) is a Hadith collection, by the famous Twelver Shia Hadith scholar Abu Jafar Muhammad Ibn Hassan Tusi, commonly known as Shaykh Tusi. This work is included among The Four Books of Shia Islam. It includes the same subjects as Tahdhib al-Ahkam (lit. Rectification of the Statutes) but in a shorter form.

Author

Muhammad ibn Tusi, commonly known as Shaykh Tusi, lived during the first half of the 5th century AH.  He is the best known jurist and Mujtahid of the Shia. Born in Tus in 385 AH, he lived his early life there. He received primary education in his homeland of Iran, and had higher studies in Baghdad. At the time Baghdad was the seat of the Abbasid Caliphate and a great center of learning. Abbaside rule stretched from Spain and south Arabia to China and from the Mediterranean coast to North Africa. Consequently, Baghdad was a seat of learning and meeting point for scholars and intellectuals from all parts of the world. The greatest personality of this period was Shaykh Mufid who resided in the Shia neighborhood of Karkh in an opulent atmosphere.

Shaykh Tusi  taught the teachings of Islam in the presence of the great masters such as Shaykh Mufid, Sharif al-Murtaza, Ibn Ghada’iri, and ibn Abdun.

Two authoritative Shia resources, Tahdhib al-Ahkam and Al-Istibsar, were written by Shaykh Tusi. He also authored many works such as Talkhis al-Shafi, al-Muqni fi ‘l-ghayba, al-Ghayba, al-Tibyan fi Tafsir al-Quran, al-Khilaf, al-Mabsut fi fiqh al-Imamiyah.

Sayyid Murtada Alam al-Huda (Sharif al-Murtaza) wrote some works on an Imamate called al-Shafi. It was written as a response to the section on Imamte of Mutazili Qadi Abd al-Jabbar’s al- Mughni. This work summarized by Shaykh Tusi that was titled Talkhis al-Shafi.

Background
Al-Istibsar is one of the four major Shia collections of Hadith authored by Shaykh Tusi. He authored this book after writing Tahdhib al-Ahkam, when his colleagues asked him to summarize the book and determined traditions which disagree and explain the reconciliation between the two without leaving out anything which was influential.

He wrote in the introduction of Al-Istibsar:

It does not include many traditions and explanations are brief.

Context
Al-Istibsar is authored about Hadiths that seemingly are at variance with each other or "show discrepancies" in their contents. It included three parts. The first two parts are about Worship (except Jihad) and the last part is allocated to subjects of jurisprudence. The first part includes 300 chapters with 1899 Hadiths. The second part has 270 chapters with 1177 Hadiths and the last part included 398 chapters with 2455 Haithes. To avoid distortion, Shaykh Tusi determined number of Hadiths in the book exactly. Al-Istibsar included 5511 Hadiths. In specific print of book, 5558 Hadiths have been reported that is caused by manner of counting.

Recitations
Many Shiite scholars have written explanations for Al-Istibsar, including the following:

 Sheykh Abdul-Latif ibn Ahmad ibn Abi Jam'e Harethi Shami Ameli (a pupil of Shaikh Bahai) in his book entitled "Jame'ul-Akhbar Fi Eizah-il-Istibsar"
 Muhammad Jamaluddin al-Makki al-Amili khnown as Shahid Awwal (The First Martyr), in his book Nukatul-Irshad (Points of Guidance)
 Sayyid Mirza Hasan ibn Abdul-Rasool Husseini Zonoozi Khu'ei (1172-1223 AH) in his work Sharhe Istibsar (Explanations of Istibsar)
 Amir Muhammad ibn Amir Abdul-Wassi' Khatoon Abadi (d.1116 AH), a son-in-law of Allameh Majlesi, in his book Sharhe Istibsar (Explanations of Istibsar)
 Sheykh Abdul-Reza Tufaili Najafi in Sharhe Istibsar(Explanations of Istibsar)
 Ibne Alwandi, Faqihe Kazemi, Qasim son of Muhammad Jawad (d. some time later than 1100 AH), a contemporary of Shaikh al-Hur al-Aamili, in his work Explanations of Istibsar
 Allamah Sayyid Muhsin ibn Hasan A'arji Kazemi (d.1127 AH), in his book Explanations of Istibsar

See also

 Al-Kafi
 Man la yahduruhu al-Faqih

References

Hadith
Hadith collections
11th-century Arabic books
Shia hadith collections
Twelver theology